The Central District of Sarpol-e Zahab County is a district (bakhsh) in Sarpol-e Zahab County, Kermanshah Province, Iran. At the 2006 census, its population was 81,428, in 18,233 families.  The District has one city: Sarpol-e Zahab. The District has five rural districts (dehestan): Beshiva Pataq Rural District, Dasht-e Zahab Rural District, Howmeh-ye Sarpol Rural District, Posht Tang Rural District, and Qaleh Shahin Rural District.

References 

Sarpol-e Zahab County
Districts of Kermanshah Province